Alcis maculata is a moth of the family Geometridae. It is found from Tibet and the Himalaya to Taiwan, Thailand, Sumatra and Borneo.

Subspecies
Alcis maculata maculata (India, Thailand, Nepal, Tibet)
Alcis maculata negans (Prout, 1932) (Borneo)
Alcis maculata prodictyota (Wehrli, 1934) (China)
Alcis maculata taiwanica (Bastelberger, 1909) (Taiwan)

References

Moths described in 1867
Boarmiini
Moths of Asia